Mala is a spicy and numbing seasoning made from Sichuan peppercorn and chilli.  Most commonly, mala is made into a sauce (麻辣醬 málàjiàng) by simmering it in oil and other spices.  Characteristic of Sichuan cuisine, particularly Chongqing cuisine, it has become one of the most popular ingredients in Chinese cuisine, spawning many regional variants.

Etymology

The term málà is a combination of two Chinese characters: "numbing" (麻) and "spicy (piquant)" (辣), referring to the feeling in the mouth after eating the sauce.

The numbness is caused by Sichuan pepper, which contains 3% hydroxy-alpha-sanshool.

History
The precise origins of the dish are unclear, but many sources attribute its development to night markets in Chongqing that targeted pier workers in the 19th to 20th century. The strong flavour and thick layer of oil helps preserve foods and removes the unpopular smells of the cheap foods, such as solidified blood, beef stomach and kidney, which were usually served to pier workers.

Despite the strong flavour by itself, various dipping sauces are often served to make the texture of cooked meat smooth and oily, and the tastes more complex. Common sauces include sesame oil with garlic, oyster oil, or doufu ru.

The sauce is used in a variety of ways, from stir-fry, stews, and soup, to being used in hot pot or as a dipping sauce.  In the Sichuan and Yunnan provinces mala powder (麻辣粉; pinyin: málàfĕn) is used on snacks and street foods, such as stinky tofu, fried potatoes, and barbecued meat and vegetables.

Ingredients
The sauce is made primarily of dried chili peppers, chili powder, douban paste, Sichuan peppercorns, clove, garlic, star anise, black cardamom, fennel, ginger, cinnamon, salt and sugar. These ingredients are simmered with beef tallow and vegetable oil for many hours, and packed into a jar. Other herbs and spices, such as sand ginger, Angelica dahurica and poppy seeds, can be added to create a unique flavour.

Traditionally, a restaurant hired a chef specializing in making this sauce; the recipes were kept secret to the chef himself. Today, prepared mala sauce can easily be found in supermarkets, and chain restaurants often produce their own sauce on a large scale, while many others still blend their own one. Like curry, there is a constant debate about the 'best' recipe and numerous variations are available on the market.

Dishes
Mala sauce is used in many dishes.

 Malatang (麻辣燙): vegetable and meat skewers served in a mala soup.  For home preparation, bouillon-style cubes of instant mala have become popular.
 Mala hot pot (麻辣火鍋)
 Mala shaokao (麻辣烧烤): Chinese barbecue flavored with mala
 Mala xiang guo (麻辣香锅): mala-flavored stir-fry
 Mala duck neck (麻辣鴨脖子)
 Mouth-watering ("drooling") chicken (口水雞): Cold chicken served in mala sauce
 Fuqi feipian (夫妻肺片): beef tendon, tongue, tripe, and sometimes also lung, served with oily mala sauce
 Dapanji (大盘鸡, lit. "big plate chicken"): a hearty chicken, potato and noodle stew flavored with mala

See also

 Mapo doufu
 Sichuan cuisine

References

Chili pepper dishes
Chinese condiments
Chinese sauces
Chongqing cuisine
Sichuan cuisine